BBC History Magazine is a British publication devoted to  both British and world history and aimed at all levels of knowledge and interest. The publication releases thirteen editions a year, one per month and a Christmas special edition, and is owned by BBC Studios but is published under license by the Immediate Media Company. BBC History is the biggest selling history magazine in the UK and is growing in circulation by nearly 7% every year.

The magazine consists of topical features, often aligning with programming currently showing on BBC Radio and Television and written by academic historians, historical analysis of news events and comparison with similar previous events, reviews of new books and media and features into significant locations in history.

History
The BBC History Magazine was launched in May 2000 by BBC Magazines with Greg Neale, an experienced journalist and history graduate, appointed as editor. In February 2004, parent company BBC Worldwide acquired publishing company Origin Publishing, which had published the rival Living History Magazine since April 2003. Living History Magazine was then incorporated into BBC History Magazine by including topics previously covered by Living History Magazine and a pull-out exploring guide, and by appointing Living History editor Dave Musgrove, a journalist and doctor of medieval archaeology. Following the merger, the magazine was more successful with increased sales and subscriptions.

The magazine has since expanded abroad: in March 2010 a partnership with Spanish publishers Ediciones Nobel launched the Spanish edition as BBC Historia and in March 2011, the Hungarian edition (retaining the English name) was launched by Hungarian publisher Kossuth Kiadó, featuring articles from Hungarian historians in addition to some translated from English. Gábor Papp (editor of chief from 2011) died in August 2020. In November 2020 Ignác Romsics, Hungarian historian became the new editor of chief. He decided some changes of the formula of magazine. In May 2022 Kossuth Kiadó announced the cessation of the magazine. In August 2022 publisher Kocsis Kiadó Zrt. (managed by András Sándor Kocsis, former leader of Kossuth Kiadó) started to publish the magazine with some changes. Greek edition was launched in December 2020.

In the news
BBC History Magazine regularly attracts media attention with its more provocative features. In the January 2006 issue, the magazine's 10 Worst Britons story was widely reported, as was its "Day for Britain" feature in the April issue (when a vote suggested that the day on which Magna Carta was signed would be a suitable day for a celebration of Britishness, to the ire of some in Scotland), and then in August 2006, its "Best British Prime Minister" feature also hit the headlines. In 2008, much media capital was made of the question posed in the magazine in a feature by Dave Musgrove: was it the right time to ask for the Bayeux Tapestry to be brought over from France for an exhibition? In November 2009, Radio 4's Today Programme picked up on a story in the magazine about when history ends and current affairs begin.

Advisory board
The magazine once had an advisory board of historians including:
Simon Schama
Richard Evans
Laurence Rees
Kenneth O Morgan
Ian Kershaw

Podcast
The magazine launched, in June 2007, its very first podcast, which features interviews with leading historians.

See also

BBC Worldwide

References

External links
BBC History Magazine website
Origin Publishing website

BBC publications
History magazines published in the United Kingdom
Magazines established in 2000
2000 establishments in the United Kingdom
Monthly magazines published in the United Kingdom